The flashed face distortion effect is a visual illusion involving the fast-paced presentation of eye-aligned faces.  Faces appear grotesquely transformed while the viewer focuses on the cross midway between them. As with many scientific discoveries, the phenomenon was first observed by chance. The effect has been applied to Hollywood celebrities, and won 2nd Place in the 8th Annual Best Illusion of the Year Contest held in 2012 under the aegis of  the Vision Sciences Society.  The phenomenon, which has gone viral on YouTube, also represents an example of scientific phenomenology which outstrips (in this case) neurological theory. According to Susanna Martinez-Conde, president of the Neural Correlate Society, which hosts the competition: “These are the best illusions of the year, so they’re very new by definition. You’re going to know the phenomenology first, and the neural underpinnings second. Typically, we don’t know why these illusions work in the brain. We may have theories, but the experiments have not been done, because it’s too early."

A 2019 paper in Scientific Reports found that the effect is equally strong when the faces are upside down. This suggests that the effect is independent of the face perception functionality of the human brain, which tends to react much stronger to right-side up faces than to inverted faces.

References

Vision
Optical illusions
Face perception